Mashreq (Arabic:  Orient Bank) is the oldest privately owned bank in the United Arab Emirates and one of the oldest banking institutions in the Middle East. Founded as the Bank of Oman in 1967, it now offers online banking and ecommerce.  

Present in major financial centers of the world, Mashreq’s home and global HQ remains in the Middle East Mashreq has 16 overseas offices in 13 countries, with corporate banking businesses in Bahrain, Qatar, Kuwait and India, as well as corporate and retail banking in Egypt and purely FI businesses in Bangladesh, Pakistan and Nepal. There are also full service branches in New York, London and Hong Kong.

Mashreq provides conventional and Islamic personal banking services including deposits, loans and credit cards; conventional and Islamic investment banking services including corporate finance and investment advisory on mergers and acquisitions, initial in public offering and underwriting; conventional and Islamic asset management services including wealth management.

Currently, more than 5,400 employees representing 65 nationalities, are employed by Mashreq, making it one of the largest employers in the UAE.

Product offerings include:

NeoBiz
Digital IPO 
Blockchain with DIFC and launched the Titan platform for comprehensive corporate banking offering.

See also

 Islamic banking
 Noor Bank
 Emirates NBD

References

External links
Mashreqbank profile on Zawya
The Institute of Export page

Banks of the United Arab Emirates
Companies based in Dubai
Companies listed on the Dubai Financial Market
Emirati brands
Emirati companies established in 1986
Emirati companies established in 1967
Banks established in 1986
Banks established in 1967